Ashington Academy  is a secondary school and sixth form located in Ashington in the English county of Northumberland.

History
It was established in 1960 as Ashington County Grammar School. It became a comprehensive school in the mid 1970s and was renamed Ashington High School. In 2007 it became a foundation school in administered by Northumberland County Council and the Ashington Learning Partnership. The school also gained specialist status as a Sports College.

Formerly an upper school for pupils aged 13 to 18, in September 2015 Ashington High School expanded to take pupils from the age of 11. Building works were undertaken at the school for the expansion.

In November 2017 Ashington High School converted to academy status and was renamed Ashington Academy. The school is now sponsored by the North East Learning Trust.

Curriculum
Ashington Academy offers GCSEs and BTECs as programmes of study for pupils, while students in the sixth form have the option to study from a range of A-levels and further BTECs.

Notable former pupils

Ashington County Grammar School
Hilton Dawson, Labour Party politician

Ashington High School
Steve Harmison, England cricket player
Mark Wood, England cricket player

References

External links
Ashington Academy official website

Educational institutions established in 1960
1960 establishments in England
Secondary schools in Northumberland
Academies in Northumberland
Ashington